Levali (Läwäle) is a rural locality (a village) and the administrative centre of Tardavsky Selsoviet, Belokataysky District, Bashkortostan, Russia. The population was 314 as of 2010. There are 5 streets.

Geography 
Levali is located 27 km west of Novobelokatay (the district's administrative centre) by road. Medyatovo is the nearest rural locality.

References 

Rural localities in Belokataysky District